Wyoming is a state in the Western United States. According to the 2020 United States Census, Wyoming is the least populous state with  inhabitants but the 9th largest by land area spanning  of land. Wyoming has 23 counties and 99 municipalities consisting of cities and towns.

A Wyoming statute indicates towns are municipalities with populations of less than 4,000. Municipalities of 4,000 or more residents are considered "first-class cities".

Cities and towns

References

2010 Wyoming Statutes

See also
List of census-designated places in Wyoming

 
 
Wyoming
Cities
Wyoming